Eugenija is a given name. Notable people with the name include:

 Eugenija Pleškytė (1938–2012), Lithuanian actress
 Lilija Eugenija Jasiūnaitė (born 1944), Lithuanian painter and textile artist

Lithuanian feminine given names